Kirkland is an unincorporated community in central Yavapai County, Arizona, United States, near the Weaver Mountains. It is southwest of the city of Prescott, the county seat of Yavapai County.  Its elevation is 3,930 feet (1,198 m).  Although Kirkland is unincorporated, it has a post office, with the ZIP code of 86332.

Kirkland is located at the intersection of Yavapai County Route 15, which runs east–west from Hillside to Arizona State Route 89 at Wilhoit, and Yavapai County Route 10, which runs north, than west to Prescott.

Kirkland is on the BNSF Railway's Phoenix Subdivision.

Education
Kirkland Elementary School District is the local school district.

 the Prescott Unified School District takes secondary students from the district, as it is required to under law. The latter operates Prescott High School.

Climate
According to the Köppen Climate Classification system, Kirkland has a semi-arid climate, abbreviated "BSk" on climate maps.

References

Unincorporated communities in Yavapai County, Arizona
Unincorporated communities in Arizona